Acacia rubricola is a shrub belonging to the genus Acacia and the subgenus Phyllodineae native to north eastern Australia.

Description
It has ribbed hairy branchlets with the phyllodes emerging from the ribs. It flowers between August and October producing simple inflorescences that have spherical flower-heads that contain 20 to 35 yellow flowers. After flowering, from late November to January, chartaceous dark brown seed pods will form that have a linear shape but are raised over the seeds,.

Distribution
It is endemic to a small area on the Binjour Plateau in south eastern Queensland near Gayndah growing in red loamy soils as a part of heathland or open Eucalyptus woodland communities.

See also
 List of Acacia species

References

rubricola
Flora of Queensland
Plants described in 1999
Taxa named by Leslie Pedley